The waterthrushes are a genus of New World warbler, Parkesia. The genus was split from Seiurus, which previously contained both waterthrush species and the ovenbird. When the genera split, the ovenbird was the only member left in Seiurus (making it a monotypic genus).

Etymology
The generic name, Parkesia, is in honor of American ornithologist Kenneth C. Parkes, who was for many years Curator of Birds at Carnegie Museum of Natural History (Sangster 2008).

Species

References 

 (Parkesia, new genus).

 
Parulidae